Senator Greenwood may refer to:

James C. Greenwood (born 1951), Pennsylvania State Senate
Levi H. Greenwood (1872–1930), Massachusetts State Senate
Tim Greenwood (born 1940s), Ohio State Senate